Bouquet, a word of French origin, pronounced , may refer to:

Decorative or creative arrangements
 Flower bouquet, an arrangement of cut flowers
 Fruit bouquet, a fruits arrangement in the form of bouquet
 Bouquet garni, a bundle of herbs used to prepare soup, stock, and various stews
 Candy Bouquet, an arrangement of candy, cellophanes, chocolate
 Vegetable bouquet
 Spiritual bouquet, a collection of prayers and spiritual actions given up for a specific purpose

In arts, entertainment, and media 

 Bouquet (EP), a 2015 EP by The Chainsmokers
 Bouquet (Robbie Basho album), 2015
 Bouquet (Percy Faith album), 1959
 Bouquet (magazine), a Japanese manga magazine

People 
 Alan Coates Bouquet (1884–1976), English minister
 Anne Bouquet (born 1952), High Commissioner of the Republic in French Polynesia
 Carole Bouquet (born 1957), French actress
 Henry Bouquet (1719–1765), British army officer
 Jean-Claude Bouquet (1819–1885), French mathematician
 Jean-Louis Bouquet (1900–1978), French screenwriter
 Jules Bouquet (1888–1955), French wrestler
 Louis Bouquet (1885–1952), French artist and illustrator
 Martin Bouquet (1685–1754), French historian
 Michel Bouquet (1925–2022), French film actor
 Michel Bouquet (born 1951), French equestrian
 Nicholas Bouquet (1842–1912), German soldier who fought in the American Civil War
 Pierre-Loup Bouquet (born 1987), French ice dancer
 Sebastián Pérez Bouquet (born 2003), Mexican footballer
 Stephane Bouquet (born 1968), French writer
 Steven Bouquet (1967–2022), British criminal

Fictional characters 
 Mireille Bouquet, one of the two protagonists in the 26-episode anime Noir
 Hyacinth Bucket, a character in Keeping Up Appearances who insists her last name is pronounced "Bouquet"

Places 
 Boquet, Pennsylvania, United States (Note: Spelled with only one "u")
 Bouquet, Gard, France
 Bouquet, Santa Fe, Argentina
 Bouquet Gardens, a major student residential complex of the University of Pittsburgh
 Bouquet Reservoir, a reservoir in Los Angeles County, California
 Bouquet River, a small river in upstate New York, USA
 Bouquet Canyon, California, an unincorporated area located in Los Angeles County
 Bouquet Bay, Antarctica

Other uses 
 Bouquet (wine), a fragrance or odor, especially when used as a description of wine
 Bouquet (magazine)
 Bouquet sou
 Kitchen Bouquet, a browning and seasoning sauce
 Bouquet, Garcin & Schivre, a French electric car manufactured between 1899 and 1906
 Bouquet of Lilies Clock, a Fabergé egg
 Bouquet Association Table (BAT), a DVB service information (DVB-SI) table that specifies TV bouquets. Each bouquet is a collection of audio/video services.
 In mathematics, a space constructed with the wedge sum, for example, the bouquet of circles

See also 
 Bouquet of Roses (disambiguation)
 Boquet (disambiguation)
 Buket (disambiguation)
 Bucket (disambiguation)
 Bokeh (disambiguation)
 Boke (disambiguation)